Hans-Joachim Birkner (22 October 1921 – 14 December 1944) was a German Luftwaffe military aviator during World War II, a fighter ace credited with 117 aerial victories—that is, 117 aerial combat encounters resulting in the destruction of the enemy aircraft—claimed in 284 combat missions, becoming an "ace-in-a-day" on three separate occasions.

Born in Schönwalde, Birkner was trained as a fighter pilot and posted to Jagdgeschwader 52 (JG 52–52nd Fighter Wing) in 1943. Fighting on the Eastern Front, he claimed his first aerial victory on 1 October 1943. Following his 98th aerial victory, Birkner was awarded the Knight's Cross of the Iron Cross on 27 July 1944. On 1 October, he was appointed Staffelkapitän (squadron leader) of 9. Staffel (9th squadron) of JG 52. Two weeks later, he claimed his 100th aerial victory. Birkner was killed in a flight accident on 14 December at an airfield at Kraków.

Early life and career
Birkner was born on 22 October 1921 at Schönwalde in East Prussia, at the time part of the Weimar Republic's Free State of Prussia. In the summer of 1943, Feldwebel Birkner had completed flight training and was posted to 9. Staffel (9th squadron) of Jagdgeschwader 52 (JG 52–52nd Fighter Wing), a squadron of III. Gruppe (3rd group). At the time, III. Gruppe was officially commanded by Major Günther Rall, occasionally replaced by either Oberleutnant Walter Krupinski on Oberleutnant Josef Haiböck.

World War II
On Friday 1 September 1939 German forces had invaded Poland which marked the beginning of World War II, and in June 1941, Germany had invaded the Soviet Union which created the Eastern Front. In late September 1943, III. Gruppe of JG 52 was equipped with the Messerschmitt Bf 109 G and fought in the Battle of the Caucasus and was based at Zaporizhia. In October, III. Gruppe flew combat missions over the right flank of the 1st Panzer Army and the left flank of 6th Army during the Battle of the Dnieper.

Eastern Front

Birkner claimed his first aerial victory on 1 October 1943 over a P-39 Airacobra in combat south-southwest of Bolschoj Tokmak. That day, III. Gruppe had claimed 17 aerial victories in an encounter with Ilyushin Il-2 ground-attack aircraft and their fighter escort. Birkner claimed his second aerial victory on 4 October over a Lavochkin-Gorbunov-Gudkov LaGG-3. The following day he shot down a Lend-Lease Douglas A-20 Havoc bomber also referred to as a "Boston". On 9 October, he claimed another LaGG-3 fighter shot down followed by two further claims over LaGG-3 fighters on 11 October. On 19 October, III. Gruppe moved to an airfield at Kirovograd, present-day Kropyvnytskyi where they stayed until 31 October. Here Birkner claimed a LaGG-3 fighter on 21 October, two LaGG-3 fighters on 24 October, a Bell P-39 Airacobra fighter and another LaGG-3 fighter on 25 October, and an Il-2 ground-attack aircraft and another P-39 fighter on 29 October.

On 1 November, III. Gruppe was moved to Apostolove fighting in the combat area between Nikopol and Zaporizhzhia. Adverse whether conditions rendered the airfield unusable and the Gruppe temporarily used an airfield near Kirovograd from 12 to 20 November. By the end of 1943, Birkner had claimed 24 aerial victories in total. Over the next few months Birkner often flew as Rottenflieger (wing man) to the high scoring aces Günther Rall and Erich Hartmann, claiming many of his victories whilst flying with them. On 3 January 1944, Birkner claimed two LaGG-3 fighters shot down, taking his total to 26 aerial victories. The Gruppe moved to an airfield at Mala Vyska on 7 January where they stayed for three days.

While based at Novokrasne, elements of III. Gruppe also operated from Ivanhorod (11 to 13 January), at Velyka Lepetykha (3 to 22 February), and Mykolaiv (2 to 23 February). Five days later, Birkner claimed five P-39 fighters shot down near Kirovograd, one of which was not confirmed. In April, he claimed a further 29 victories, including six in one day on 19 April making him an "ace-in-a-day" for the first time, taking his total to 60 aerial victories. In May, he claimed 17 victories, including another "ace-in-a-day" achievement on 30 May.

III. Gruppe relocated to Roman on 1 June. On 3 June, Birkner claimed three Lavochkin aircraft shot down north of Iași. On 24 June, the United States Army Air Forces' (USAAF) Fifteenth Air Force attacked various targets in Romania with 377 bombers. A fraction of this attack force, consisting of 135 Consolidated B-24 Liberator and Lockheed P-38 Lightning and North American P-51 Mustang fighters, headed for the Ploiești oilfields. Defending against this attack, Birkner claimed a P-51 shot down, his 91st aerial victory. Birkner was awarded the Knight's Cross of the Iron Cross on 27 July 1944 for 98 victories.

Squadron leader and death
On 1 October 1944, Birkner was appointed Staffelkapitän (squadron leader) of 9. Staffel of JG 52. He thus succeeded Oberleutnant Hartmann who was transferred. At the time of this assignment, III. Gruppe was based in Warzyn Pierwszy, Poland. The Gruppe was under the command of Hauptmann Wilhelm Batz and Oberstleutnant Hermann Graf had just taken over the JG 52 as Geschwaderkommodore (wing commander). On 8 October, III. Here, Birkner claimed an Il-2 ground-attack aircraft shot down on 14 October, his 100th aerial victory. He was the 95th Luftwaffe pilot to achieve the century mark. Two days later on 16 October, he became an "ace-in-a-day" for the second time, claiming four LaGG fighters and a single Il-2 ground-attack aircraft.

Here Birkner claimed five further aerial victories over LaGG fighters, one on 23 October, and two each on 25 and 27 October respectively. On 7 November, III. Gruppe again moved to the airfield at Warzyn Pierwszy. On 12 December, the Gruppe relocated to Krakau, present-day Kraków. Two days later, Birkner was killed in a flying accident when his Bf 109 G-14/U4 (Werknummer 510531—factory number) suffered engine failure during the landing approach at Krakau. Following his death, command of 9. Staffel was passed on to Hauptmann Otto-Karl Klemenz.

Summary of career

Aerial victory claims
According to US historian David T. Zabecki, Birkner was credited with 117 aerial victories. Spick also lists Birkner with 117 aerial victories claimed in 284 combat missions. His victories were recorded over the Eastern Front and included one USAAF P-51 fighter. Included in his total are at least 15 Ilyushin Il-2 Sturmoviks. Mathews and Foreman, authors of Luftwaffe Aces – Biographies and Victory Claims, researched the German Federal Archives and state that Birkner was credited with 117 aerial victories. This figure includes 116 aerial victories on the Eastern Front and one over the Western Allies.

Victory claims were logged to a map-reference (PQ = Planquadrat), for example "PQ 34 Ost 58842". These sectors were then subdivided into 36 smaller units to give a location area 3 × 4 km in size.

Awards
 Honour Goblet of the Luftwaffe on 24 April 1944 as Fahnenjunker-Feldwebel and pilot
 German Cross in Gold on 20 March 1944 as Fahnenjunker-Feldwebel in the 9./Jagdgeschwader 52
 Knight's Cross of the Iron Cross on 27 July 1944 as Fahnenjunker-Feldwebel and pilot in the 9./Jagdgeschwader 52

Notes

References

Citations

Bibliography

External links

1921 births
1944 deaths
People from East Prussia
Luftwaffe pilots
German World War II flying aces
Luftwaffe personnel killed in World War II
Recipients of the Gold German Cross
Recipients of the Knight's Cross of the Iron Cross